The 2006 Wake Forest Demon Deacons football team represented Wake Forest University during the 2006 NCAA Division I FBS football season. The team was coached by Jim Grobe, in his fifth season at the school, and played its home games at Groves Stadium (now known as BB&T Field). The Deacons finished the regular season with a 10–2 record, giving them the first 10-win season in their history, and won the Atlantic Division of the Atlantic Coast Conference. The subsequent victory ain the conference championship game gave Wake Forest their first conference championship in 36 years. As such, they represented the ACC in the Orange Bowl. The team ended the season with an 11–3 record and a number 17 ranking in the nation. The team and its star linebacker Jon Abbate would become the subject of a 2011 feature film, The 5th Quarter. They did not win the Atlantic Division again until 2021.

Pre-season
After finishing 4–7 in 2005 and in a tie for fourth place in the Atlantic Division of the ACC, the Deacons were picked in the pre-season to finish last in the division by the ACC media, among others, making the Deacons' run at the ACC title largely unexpected.

Coaching change
After Deacons' wide receivers coach Kevin Sherman left to take an assistant coaching position at Virginia Tech, Tim Billings was hired as his replacement. Billings was touted as having 23-years of experience at the college football level, including a six-year stint as head coach of Southeast Missouri State.

Roster changes
Although the Deacons returned an ACC high 18 starters from the 2005 team, they lost four key starters to graduation. On defense, the only starter to leave was nose tackle, Goryal Scales. On offense, three starters graduated, including wide receiver Chris Davis, quarterback Cory Randolph, and running back and ACC Player of the Year award-winner Chris Barclay. Finally, Ray Guy Award-winning punter Ryan Plackemeier also graduated.

Recruiting
During recruiting, the Deacons signed 15 new players for the team, including a number of three-star recruits and Josh Adams, a top-10 ranked running back. The team added eight players on offense, six on defense and a kicker, however before the season began, tight end recruit, Dennis Godfrey, decided not to enroll to the school.

Award candidates
Five Demon Deacon players were named to pre-season national award watchlists:
Jon Abbate – Heisman Trophy
Micah Andrews – Doak Walker Award
Josh Gattis – Jim Thorpe Award
Sam Swank – Lou Groza Award
Steve Vallos – Outland Trophy

Along with the award candidates, six players were named as pre-season All-Americans on three lists. Andrews and Vallos on the first team and Abbate and Gattis on the second team were named so by the Sporting News, Abbate and Vallos were named on the first team by the Blue Ribbon College Football Yearbook, and finally, Vallos on the third team and Abbate, Gattis, Matt Robinson, and Swank as honorable mentions by Street & Smith.

Roster

Coaching staff

Schedule

Rankings

Game summaries

Syracuse

In the first game of the season, the Deacons took on the Syracuse Orange. For the first half, every time the Deacons scored, like quarterback Ben Mauk's 14-yard pass to Willie Idlette, the Orange answered. The half ended with the teams tied 10–10. In the second half, despite throwing an interception early in the quarter, Mauk led the Deacons to an eventual field goal to give them a 13–10 lead in the third quarter. However, before the field goal, Mauk suffered an injury to his right arm when two Syracuse players fell on the arm as he was attempting to recover a fumble. He was replaced by Riley Skinner who only threw one pass. In the fourth quarter, on the final scoring drive, the Deacons took nearly eight minutes off the clock with their running game, and scored on a 19-yard run by De'Angelo Bryant. The Deacons won the game 20–10, but had to make a decision on their quarterback.

Duke

With Riley Skinner given the go-ahead to take over as the starting quarterback, the Deacons had to take on visiting Duke, a team who had only won one game in 2005. Duke, however, took an early lead with a 27-yard field goal and a 47-yard touchdown pass to take a 10–0 lead at halftime. Finally answering, Skinner threw the first touchdown pass of his career, a 5-yard pass to John Tereshinski, to bring them within three. The Blue Devils kicked another field goal, this one of 39-yards to take a 13–7 lead into the fourth quarter. Late in the fourth, the Deacons took their first lead of the game on a 2-yard touchdown run by Micah Andrews. With a minute remaining, the Blue Devils started a drive that brought them to the Deacons 11-yard line. With six seconds remaining, they attempted a game-winning field goal, however, Chip Vaughn was able to block the attempt to give the Deacons a 14–13 win.

@ Connecticut

On their first road game of the season, the Deacons went to face the Connecticut Huskies. They took an early lead on an interception of D.J. Hernandez by Jeremy Thompson, who returned the ball 86-yards for the touchdown. Hernandez was able to bring the Huskies back and tied the game later in the quarter on a 6-yard pass, but Micah Andrews' 6-yard run for a touchdown gave the Deacons a lead they would never relinquish. In the second quarter, Lou Allen's 15-yard touchdown brought the Huskies within one after a missed extra point, to have the half end with the Deacons ahead 14–13. With no score in the third quarter, the Deacons padded their lead in the fourth with a 43-yard field goal by Sam Swank and another 6-yard touchdown run, this time by Richard Belton, to give the final score of the game as 24–13. With the win, the Deacons were 3–0 for the first time in 19 years.

@ Ole Miss

The Deacons visited Ole Miss for their fourth game, and once again relied on their running and kicking games to win a game. Despite not having Micah Andrews, De'Angelo Bryant took over for him and gave the Deacons an early lead on a 9-yard touchdown. With a 38-yard field goal by Swank, and the Rebels' only answer of a 26-yard field goal, the Deacons took a 10–3 lead into the half. In the third quarter the Deacons added two more rushing touchdowns and another field goal to pad their lead. With no score in the fourth, the Deacons won the game 27–3.

Liberty

The Deacons next took on the Division I FCS Liberty Flames. This time winning without only relying on their running game. Skinner threw for 218 yards including a 59-yard touchdown that gave the Deacons a 27–7 lead at halftime. Although the Flames were able to score twice, the Deacons easily outscored and outplayed them, winning 34–14.

Clemson

The No. 12 ranked Clemson Tigers next came to visit the Deacons. Although the Tigers took an early lead with a field goal, a pair of touchdown passes, one by Skinner and the other on a trick play Nate Morton to Skinner, gave the Deacons a 14–3 lead at the half. In the third quarter, a 22-yard field goal by Swank gave the Deacons a 17–3 lead that wouldn't hold. On the first play of the fourth quarter a fumble on the Deacons' 35-yard line was returned by Gaines Adams for a touchdown. Three minutes later the Tigers tied the game on a 20-yard pass and then took a lead with a 72-yard touchdown run. With a final field goal, the Tigers ended the game, winning 27–17 and breaking the Deacons' winning streak.

@ NC State

The Deacons next visited the NC State Wolfpack. Taking an early lead with a touchdown run and a 51-yard field goal, the Wolfpack came back and scored two touchdowns to give them a 14–10 lead. However, after Swank kicked a 53-yard field goal, the Deacon defense forced a safety with a minute left in the half. Skinner was able to capitalize with a 57-yard touchdown pass to Nate Morton to take a 22–14 lead into the half. In the fourth quarter, with the Wolfpack down five after a field goal, Swank kicked another 53-yard field goal to give the Deacons an eight-point advantage. With a touchdown with five minutes remaining, the Wolfpack brought the score within two points, however failed on the two-point conversion attempt. After holding the Deacons, the Wolfpack moved to the 40-yard line before a pass intercepted by Josh Gattis ended the game. The Deacons won the game 25–23 and were 6–1 for the first time since 1979. After the game the team was ranked

@ North Carolina

The Deacons next visited the North Carolina Tar Heels. After a blocked punt was returned for a touchdown by the Deacons, the Tar Heels were able to tie the game with a 1-yard touchdown pass. In the second quarter, after another touchdown by the Deacons, the Tar Heels once again answered and the teams were tied 14–14 at the half. In the third quarter the Tar Heels took their first lead with a 35-yard field goal. The Deacons wouldn't answer until early in the fourth quarter on a Swank field goal. They took their final lead on a Skinner pass of 39-yards. Down by a touchdown, the Tar Heels drove to scoring range, however, an errant pass on the final play of the game was intercepted by Jon Abbate to seal the win for the Deacons, 24–17. With the win the team was 7–1 for only the third time in school history.

Boston College

The No. 16 ranked Boston College Eagles next faced the Deacons. The Deacons took the lead midway through the first quarter on a 9-yard reverse by Willie Idlette. After a drive that ended on the first play of the second quarter gave the Eagles a 1-yard touchdown run, the Deacons answered later in the quarter with a 46-yard touchdown pass by Skinner. On the Eagles' next drive, quarterback Matt Ryan threw an interception in the endzone that ended their scoring chance. The half ended with the Deacons winning 14–7. On the Deacons first play of the second half, after holding the Eagles on a fourth down attempt, Kevin Marion ran for an 81-yard touchdown. Ryan answered later on a 2-yard scramble to put the Eagles down 21–14 at the end of the third quarter. In the fourth, the Eagles, after missing a 40-yard field goal, forced an interception from Skinner. On their drive, however, after an 11-yard run, L.V. Whitworth fumbled the ball to end the drive. On their last chance in the game, after converting a fourth down, Ryan threw a second interception in the endzone to Patrick Ghee, to seal the win for the Deacons, 21–14. The Deacons beat a ranked team for the first time in nine chances, were 8–1 for the first time since 1944, and tied a school record for wins in a season.

@ Florida State

The Deacons next went to Tallahassee to face the Florida State Seminoles, a team the Deacons hadn't beaten in Tallahassee since 1959 and who they had lost to 14 straight games. The Deacons dominated the game, however, and had a 20–0 lead at halftime. With both Seminole quarterbacks throwing two interceptions each, one of which was returned for a 48-yard touchdown, the Deacons held the Seminoles scoreless for the first time at home since Bobby Bowden started as their coach. With a final score of 30–0, the Deacons won a school record ninth game in the season.

Virginia Tech

The No. 19 Virginia Tech Hokies next visited the Deacons. The Hokies took an early lead on a 49-yard touchdown pass in the first quarter. After losing ACC-leading rusher Branden Ore in the first quarter, the Hokies didn't score again until after the half. The Deacons, however, couldn't take advantage, and only scored a field goal to trail 7–3 at halftime. Early in the third quarter, the Hokies scored again on a long pass of 53-yards. The Deacons answered with another field goal, but the Hokies kept an 11-point lead after their own field goal. After a fumble was returned by the Hokies for 35-yards, the Deacons never answered again. The Hokies padded their lead with a fourth-quarter field goal, to give them the win, 27–6.

@ Maryland

The Deacons visited the Maryland Terrapins for their final game of the regular season and with a chance to win the ACC Atlantic Division. The Terrapins took a touchdown lead midway through the first quarter, however a Kevin Harris 2-yard touchdown run answered for the Deacons. The Deacons then scored two touchdowns, including a 49-yard pass from Skinner to Willie Idlette to take the lead. The Terrapins scored late in the half to bring the halftime score to 21–14 in favor of the Deacons. In the third quarter both teams traded field goals, but another Harris touchdown run gave the Deacons another two touchdown lead. In the fourth, both teams scored short touchdowns, but the early lead was enough for the Deacons who won 38–24. With the win, the Deacons won the Atlantic Division of the ACC and advanced to the ACC Championship game against the Coastal Division champion Georgia Tech Yellow Jackets.

vs. Georgia Tech–ACC Championship Game

The Deacons next went to Jacksonville to face the No. 22 Georgia Tech Yellow Jackets in the second annual ACC Championship game. Both teams' defenses dominated the game, as each held the opposing offenses to under 300 yards for the game. The Deacons defense intercepted two Reggie Ball passes to help their effort. In the first half, both teams kicked field goals to go to halftime tied at 3. Early in the fourth quarter the Yellow Jackets took another lead with a second field goal to take a 6–3 lead. However, the Deacons came back and kicked two more field goals, the second with three minutes remaining in the game, to win the game 9–6. The winning score was the lowest for a conference champion ever. With the win, the Deacons won their second ACC Championship and won the ACC's spot in the BCS.

vs. Louisville–Orange Bowl

In the Deacons' first BCS bowl game they went to the Orange Bowl to play the No. 6 Louisville Cardinals, winners of the Big East. The Deacons took an early lead with a field goal, however the Cardinals answered with their own field goal and a touchdown in the first quarter to take a 10–3 lead to halftime. In the third quarter, Skinner tied the game on a 30-yard touchdown pass and took a three-point lead in the fourth after a 36-yard field goal. The lead didn't last too long, as the Cardinals scored a quick touchdown and another one later in the quarter. With the scores the Cardinals took a 24–13 win. Even with the loss, the Deacons finished their best season in school history.

Postseason

Awards

Conference
Upon winning the conference many Deacons players and coach Jim Grobe received conference honors. Grobe was unanimously named the ACC Coach of the Year by the media. Along with Grobe's honor, Riley Skinner was singled out by the media and was named the ACC Rookie of the Year. Along with the individual awards, nine players, five on the first team, one on the second, and three honorable mention, a Wake Forest record, were named to the All-ACC team.

National
Two players and once again Jim Grobe were honored as finalists for national awards. Zac Selmon was named as a Wuerffel Trophy finalist, Sam Swank was named as a semifinalist for both the Lou Groza Award and the Ray Guy Award, and Grobe was a finalist for the Eddie Robinson Coach of the Year. Although none won, Grobe was named coach of the year by five other organizations, including the AP award and the Bobby Dodd Coach of the Year Award.

Along with the award winners, six players were named by four sources to their All-America teams. Sam Swank was named to the first teams of Rivals.com, ESPN, and Sports Illustrated. Also named by Sports Illustrated were Steve Vallos also on the first team and Jon Abbate and Josh Gattis as honorable mentions. Vallos was also named by the Sporting News to their team. Finally, Jeff Griffin on the second team and Riley Skinner on the third team, were named by the Sporting News to their Freshman All-American team.

Roster changes
Ten former starters left due to graduation or being drafted in the 2007 NFL Draft. Mauk, who had to undergo extensive reconstructive surgery on his injured throwing arm, graduated and then left to pursue a master's degree. He took advantage of an NCAA rule (later repealed and still later restored) allowing graduate students with remaining athletic eligibility to transfer and gain immediate eligibility at their new school, and finished his college career as the starting quarterback at the University of Cincinnati. Nine other players went on to the NFL, including Josh Gattis who was selected in the fifth round of the draft by Jacksonville and Steve Vallos who was selected in the seventh round by Seattle.
After the season, former recruit Dennis Godfrey enrolled with the new class.

References

Wake Forest
Wake Forest Demon Deacons football seasons
Atlantic Coast Conference football champion seasons
Wake Forest Demon Deacons football